Sandy Claws is a 1955 Warner Bros. Looney Tunes cartoon directed by Friz Freleng. The short was released on April 2, 1955, and stars Tweety, Sylvester and Granny. The voices are performed by Mel Blanc and Bea Benaderet. This short was nominated for an Academy Award for Best Animated Short Film in 1954, but lost to When Magoo Flew.

Sandy Claws marks the final time Benaderet would voice Granny; in later films, Granny would be voiced by June Foray. In addition, after the release of this short, Granny would be overhauled. Her appearance and dress would be updated (starting with "Red Riding Hoodwinked"), and while her cheerful demeanour would be retained (with a few exceptions), her old-fashioned characteristics and mannerisms—such as her dress and inability to relate to present-day trends—would be de-emphasized.

Plot
Granny has taken Tweety to the beach for the day. Granny tells Tweety she can't wait to try on her new "bikini bathing suit" and promises to return right away. Meanwhile, Sylvester is fishing on the pier and, after pointing a gun at a worm, is immediately swallowed by a huge fish. After expressing his disgust about his lack of success, the cat spots Tweety in his cage, sitting on a rock across the pier and unguarded. Sylvester thinks he's in for a free meal ... until the tide comes in and washes Sylvester away. The high waters surround Tweety's cage, leaving the bird to yell for help.

Sylvester then devises a variety of tricks to stay dry and ferry himself across the flooded beach to get at his meal:

 Lowering himself toward the bird's cage by tying his fishing line around his chest; however, the line comes out of the reel, sending the cat into the sea.
 Driving a motorboat to the perch, but failing to notice the boat is still tied to the dock.
 Powering himself with an outboard motor and a pair of waterskis. However, he crashes into the rock.
 Inflating a pair of balloons to use as water wings; he is immediately surrounded by five hungry sharks, who bite at the cat. Sylvester gets away, de-furred to the point where it appears he's wearing a Tarzan-like loincloth. After doing Tarzan's trademark chest-beating and yell, he collapses on the sandbar.

Eventually, Granny (who emerges from the bathhouse in an old-fashioned, turn-of-the-20th century one-piece swimming body costume and shower cap) sees the flooded beach and Sylvester attempting to get at Tweety. Unaware of Sylvester's true motives, Granny believes the cat is attempting to rescue the bird and—in a change of her usual attitude toward him—offers to help Sylvester. At one point, both are washed away when the tide comes in again; this happens after Sylvester gets knocked silly after hitting his head against the dock, and Granny tries to help him come to by splashing water on him (Sylvester: "Sufferin' succotash! You didn't have to overdo it!").

Later, Granny gives Sylvester a diving suit and keeps watch over the air pressure. Just then, a frustrated Tweety realizes that the only way he'll be rescued is if he rows his cage ashore himself ... which he does successfully. Granny sees Tweety come ashore and joyously runs to reunite with her beloved canary. She then forgets about the "heroic pussycat," who in Granny's diverted attention has allowed the air pressure machine to shut off, leaving Sylvester without any oxygen. Granny overcompensates by hastily pumping the machine, dangerously over-inflating the suit. Sylvester manages to free himself, just as Granny is talking with Tweety about her appreciation of the cat's rescue efforts; she tells the bird, "He certainly deserves a just reward!" Which Sylvester does, but a very nasty one: the cartoon ends with him landing in the City Dog Pound!

Home media
The cartoon is available uncut and fully restored on Academy Awards Animation Collection DVD set and on the second disc of Looney Tunes Platinum Collection: Volume 3 Blu-ray set.

References

External links

 
 

1955 animated films
1955 short films
Looney Tunes shorts
Short films directed by Friz Freleng
1950s Warner Bros. animated short films
Films scored by Carl Stalling
Films set on beaches
1955 films
Animated films about cats
Animated films about birds
Tweety films
Sylvester the Cat films
1950s English-language films